The 2009 Southeastern Conference baseball tournament was held at Regions Park in Hoover, AL from May 20 through 24. LSU won the tournament and earned the Southeastern Conference's automatic bid to the 2009 NCAA Division I baseball tournament. LSU won the College World Series in Omaha, Nebraska.

Regular Season results
The top eight teams (based on conference results) from the conference earned invites to the tournament.

Format
The 2009 tournament will once again feature a "flipped bracket".  This means that after two days of play the undefeated team from each bracket will move into the other bracket.  This reduces the number of rematches teams will have to play in order to win the tournament.

Tournament

* Game went into extra innings.
^ Game ended after 8 innings due to Mercy Rule.
Auburn, Mississippi St., Kentucky and Tennessee did not make the tournament.

All-Tournament Team

See also
College World Series
NCAA Division I Baseball Championship
Southeastern Conference baseball tournament

External links
2009 SEC Baseball Tournament @ SECSports.com
2015 SEC Baseball Tournament Attendance @ SECSports.com

Tournament
Southeastern Conference Baseball Tournament
Southeastern Conference baseball tournament
Southeastern Conference baseball tournament
College sports tournaments in Alabama
Baseball competitions in Hoover, Alabama